Brazil competed at the 1992 Paralympic Games in Barcelona for physically and vision-impaired athletes. Immediately after the Barcelona Games, the city of Madrid held events for athletes with an intellectual disability. The Madrid results are not included in International Paralympic Committee Historical Results Database. In Barcelona, Brazil finished 31st in the total medal count winning 7 medals (3 gold and 4 bronzes). At the Catalan city, the country has competed with 41 athletes and won medals in 3 sports – swimming, athletics and judo. Brazil finished thirteenth in Madrid with 1 gold, 3 silvers and 1 bronze, totalizing a total of another 5 medals and finished the games at the 28th place.

See also 
 Brazil at the Paralympics
 Brazil at the 1992 Summer Olympics

References 

Brazil at the Paralympics
1992 in Brazilian sport
Nations at the 1992 Summer Paralympics